Arsinoe of Macedon (lived 4th century BC) was a Macedonian noblewoman and the mother of Ptolemy (323 – 283 BC), Pharaoh of Egypt. 

Arsinoe was of the Argead dynasty, and originally a concubine of Philip II, king of Macedon, and it is said she was given by Philip to Lagus, a Macedonian nobleman, while she was pregnant with Ptolemy I Soter, but it is possible that this is a later myth fabricated to glorify the Ptolemaic Dynasty. Alternately, Ptolemy's lineage to the Argead dynasty was found through his mother, Arsinoe, in this case Arsinoe is daughter of Meleager, who was a cousin of Amyntas III and son of Balacrus, son of Amyntas, son of Alexander I of Macedon. Contemporary and modern research concludes the latter claim much more valid than Philip II as Ptolemy’s father, now dismissed as a myth.

Notes

References
Smith, William (editor); Dictionary of Greek and Roman Biography and Mythology, "Arsinoe (1)", Boston, (1867)

Ancient Macedonian women
Ptolemaic dynasty
4th-century BC Greek women
4th-century BC Macedonians